Balam Pichkari is a Hindi song from the 2013 Bollywood film, Yeh Jawaani Hai Deewani, with music composed by Pritam Chakraborty, lyrics by Amitabh Bhattacharya, and sung by Shalmali Kholgade & Vishal Dadlani. The music video of the track mainly focuses on actors Ranbir Kapoor, Deepika Padukone and Kalki Koechlin, and Aditya Roy Kapoor. This song is often played during Holi such as on TV shows.

Background 
This song was shot in 4 days but the choreography of the dance was recorded in three minutes and thirty seconds. It was choreographed by Remo Dsouza

Release and Response 
The music video of the song was officially released on 22 June 2013 as a part of the soundtrack of film, through the YouTube channel of T-Series. It become the top choice to play on the festival of Holi having 100 Million+ views. This song is also represented as a symbol of friendship.

References 

Hindi songs
Hindi film songs
Arijit Singh songs
Songs written for films
2013 songs
Songs with music by Pritam Chakraborty
Songs with lyrics by Amitabh Bhattacharya